Jason "Jacko" Barry (born February 13, 1975 in Dublin) is an Irish former professional darts player who competes in the Professional Darts Corporation tournaments.

Career

Barry won a place in the 2007 World Grand Prix, coming through a record-breaking field of 549 players at the Citywest Hotel, Dublin to qualify. He competed against World No. 16 Andy Jenkins in the first round and managed to push him to the limit, losing two sets to one.

Following the World Grand Prix, Barry qualified for the 2008 PDC World Darts Championship, beating Jamie Harvey 5-3 in his last match. He faced fellow Dubliner Mick McGowan in the first round, losing 0-3 in sets.

Barry followed these tournaments up with a good showing at the 2008 UK Open. He defeated Adrian Welsh in the early stages of the tournament and followed this with a 9-2 victory over pub-qualifier Alan Casey, to secure his place in the last 32. The fourth round draw placed Barry in the biggest game of his career to date against the World No. 1 darter and defending champion Raymond van Barneveld. Coming from 1-5 down, Barry levelled 6-6 with finishes of 128 and 140 before Barneveld eventually took a 9-7 victory.

Barry made an impressive appearance at the 2008 World Grand Prix, making him the first Irish player ever to make two successive appearances. Following a first round victory over Fermanagh's Brendan Dolan, Barry was defeated 3-0 by the World Champion John Part. He also qualified for the inaugural European Darts Championship in Frankfurt but lost to Phil Taylor in round one.

Barry qualified for his third successive World Grand Prix in 2009. He beat Mick McGowan 2-0 in the first round before defeating Steve Beaton 3-2 in the second round to set up a quarter final clash with Raymond van Barneveld. Barry lost to Barneveld in four straight sets.

Shortly after his run in the 2009 World Grand Prix,

Barry quit the PDC circuit in 2009.

World Championship Results

PDC

2008: 1st Round (lost to Mick McGowan 0–3) (sets)

References

External links

1975 births
Irish darts players
Sportspeople from Dublin (city)
British Darts Organisation players
Professional Darts Corporation former pro tour players
Living people